Novljani were a medieval Serb tribe, which became the component part of the Drobnjaci tribe in Old Herzegovina (in Montenegro). According to folklore, the Novljani was a Serb tribe that settled Bosnia at the time of the Serb settlement in the Balkans, then later crossed into the Banjani plateau in Old Herzegovina. From there, the Novljani and other Serb tribes pushed out the native population towards the Tara and source of Morača, and towards the south, Podgorica, and then settled and divided the conquered lands between themselves. This happened in olden times, surely prior to the 13th century. The Novljani received the wide land that later encompassed the tribes of Banjani and Drobnjaci. The larger part of Novljani that settled Drobnjak inhabited the whole region between Onogošt (Nikšić) and the Tara river, and from at that time the Piva border to Upper Morača — this part of the Novljani was later named Drobnjaci. The Novljani first settled "korito Drobnjaka" in the area of Drobnjak, where they founded settlements. In Drobnjak, the tribe held the land through which the Roman Onogošt–Pirliktor merchant road crossed. After expanding in numbers, they took over Jezera from the Kriči tribe.

The Novljani settled as an organized tribe, headed by a vojvoda and several knezovi. They settled the area of Drobnjak and called themselves the Drobnjaci. It is unknown whether they collectively descend from one ancestor or a group of various families connected to the general tribal organization.

According to folklore, a part of the Drobnjak families descend from the old Novljani. Today the Novljani number 113 families out of 385 of the Drobnjaci. The Kosovčić brotherhood was the most numerous of the tribe, and for long led the whole tribe of Drobnjaci, also enumerated in epic poetry. Another notable brotherhood, which also led the whole tribe, was the Kosorić.

References

Sources
Books and monographs
 
 
 

Journals

Drobnjaci
Medieval Montenegro
Tribes of Montenegro